Sterling USD 376 is a public unified school district headquartered in Sterling, Kansas, United States.  The district includes the communities of Sterling, Alden, Saxman, and nearby rural areas.

Schools
The school district operates the following schools:
 Sterling High School
 Sterling Junior High School
 Sterling Grade School

See also
 List of unified school districts in Kansas
 List of high schools in Kansas
 Kansas State Department of Education
 Kansas State High School Activities Association

References

External links
 

School districts in Kansas
Education in Rice County, Kansas